Memet (Mehmet) Bogujevci (born 3 May 1951) is a Yugoslav former boxer. He competed in the men's welterweight event at the 1980 Summer Olympics. At the European Championships in 1977, he won the bronze medal in the light welterweight class.

References

External links
 

1951 births
Living people
Yugoslav male boxers
Olympic boxers of Yugoslavia
Boxers at the 1980 Summer Olympics
Place of birth missing (living people)
Mediterranean Games medalists in boxing
AIBA World Boxing Championships medalists
Welterweight boxers
Mediterranean Games gold medalists for Yugoslavia
Competitors at the 1979 Mediterranean Games